James (Jim) Robinson is the vice chair of the  Coalition for Epidemic Preparedness Innovations (CEPI).

Robinson manages the CEPI manufacturing strategy for a COVID-19 vaccine.

Career 
Robinson began his career as a biochemical engineer with G.D. Searle and worked at various companies before becoming the head of technical support for Merck's vaccine, biologics and sterile manufacturing in 2010.

In 2017, Robinson began serving on CEPI's scientific advisory board. He was made vice-chair in 2019.

References 

Living people
Year of birth missing (living people)
Pharmacists
Medical researchers